Asagyokusei Taiko (Japanese 朝玉勢 大幸, born May 29, 1993 as Kazuma Tamaki) is a Japanese professional sumo wrestler from Mie Prefecture. He debuted in January 2016 and he reached his highest rank of jūryō 12 in January 2020. He wrestles for Takasago stable.

Early life and sumo background

Born in Ise, Mie in 1993, he was active in his schools' sumo clubs throughout his childhood and eventually became the captain of Kindai University's sumo club.

Career 
Debuting in maezumō in January 2016, he posted a 2-2 record. In his first tournament in March 2016, where he was ranked in jonokuchi, he won the yūshō with a perfect 7-0 record and went on to win the jonidan yūshō, also with a perfect record, the next tournament in May 2016. The next tournament in September 2016 he was promoted to sandanme where he posted a 6-1 record which saw him further promoted to makushita. 

For almost three years he remained in makushita until September 2019 when he was promoted to jūryō 14. His record of 5-10 that tournament sent him back to makushita in the November 2019 tournament, however, he managed to get promoted back to jūryō where he reached his highest rank of jūryō 12 in January 2020. He once again failed to post a winning record but managed to keep his rank where he also failed to post a winning score in March 2020, which sent him back to makushita in July 2020.

As of July 2021 he currently wrestles in the makushita division, having only posted a single winning record over the last seven tournaments.

Fighting style 
Asagyokusei is an oshi-style wrestler, employing kimarite such as yorikiri and kotenage.

Career record

See also
List of active sumo wrestlers

References

External links 

1993 births
Sumo people from Mie Prefecture
Japanese sumo wrestlers
People from Ise, Mie
Kindai University alumni
Living people